Nandi Tuaine Glassie (21 May 1951 – 4 September 2020) was a Cook Islands politician who served as a Cabinet Minister.  He was a member of the Cook Islands Party.

Glassie was born in Atiu, and educated at Atiu Primary School, Tereora College, then St Stephens School in Auckland.  He attended the University of Auckland, graduating with a bachelor of Arts, before completing a Masters in Public Policy at Massey University. He had a long career as a public servant for the New Zealand Department of Labour, the Manukau City Council, and the Cook Islands Government.  From 2005 – 2006 he was chief of staff in the office of the Cook Islands Prime Minister.

Glassie was first elected to Parliament in the 2006 snap election, defeating Cook Islands Democratic Party MP Eugene Tatuava.  He served as a backbench MP for the 2006 – 2010 term

Cabinet
Glassie was re-elected in the 2010 election and appointed to Cabinet as Minister of Health and Minister of Agriculture. A Cabinet reshuffle in November 2013 saw him lose the Agriculture portfolio to Kiriau Turepu and take over as Minister of Internal Affairs, the Ombudsman, and Parliamentary Services.

He was re-elected at the 2014 election. A further Cabinet reshuffle in March 2015 saw him yield the Internal Affairs and Ombudsman portfolios to Albert Nicholas and become Minister of Justice. During this term Glassie launched a mental health strategy and a health workforce plan.

He lost his seat at the 2018 election to Te-Hani Brown. Following his election loss Glassie founded the Cook Islands United Party with former MP Teariki Heather. He subsequently contested the 2019 March Tengatangi-Areora-Ngatiarua by-election, sparked by the defection of Te-Hani Brown from the Democratic Party, as a Democratic Party candidate, but was unsuccessful. When Brown resigned again to avoid an unfavourable election petition ruling, he was too ill to contest a second by-election.

Glassie had four sons and lived with his wife in Rarotonga. He died on Rarotonga on 4 September 2020 of cancer.

References

1951 births
2020 deaths
People from Atiu
University of Auckland alumni
Massey University alumni
Cook Island Māori people
Members of the Parliament of the Cook Islands
Cook Islands Party politicians
Agriculture ministers of the Cook Islands
Health ministers of the Cook Islands
Interior ministers of the Cook Islands
Justice ministers of the Cook Islands
New Zealand public servants